Acupalpus hilaris is an insect-eating ground beetle of the Acupalpus genus.

References

hilaris
Beetles described in 1899